Dileep Raj (born 2 September 1978) is an Indian actor, film/television director and producer known for his work in Kannada cinema. He has appeared in 24 films. After a successful career in television as a supporting actor, he made his film debut as a lead actor in Boy Friend that released in 2005. He shot to popularity with the blockbuster film Milana (2007),essaying the role of a protagonist alongside Puneeth Rajkumar. In his 2016 film, "U Turn", he played a leading role in the dramatic thriller. He has also acted in stage roles, including the leading role in the play Treadmill.

Personal life
Dileep Raj was born in Bangalore, Karnataka. He is married to Srividya. They have two daughters.

Career

He acted in popular television serials, including Janani, Ardha Satya,  Rangoli, Kumkuma Baghya, Mangalya, Malebillu, Preetigaagi and Rathasapthami which is based on a true incident. He is also a dubbing artist. He has dubbed in many Kannada films like Aa Dinagalu (For Chethan’s character) and many more.

Filmography
''All films are in Kannada, unless otherwise noted.

Television

Producer

References

External links

Living people
1978 births
Indian male film actors
Indian male television actors